Saryevo is a rural locality (a settlement) in Saryevskoye Rural Settlement, Vyaznikovsky District, Vladimir Oblast, Russia. The population was 641 as of 2010.

Geography 
The village is located 4 km north-west from Saryevo and 30 km west from Vyazniki.

References 

Rural localities in Vyaznikovsky District